, is a 1997 role-playing video game developed and published by Hudson Soft and Red Company for the Sega Saturn. The game was released in Japan on January 14, 1997. It was ported to the PlayStation Portable on July 13, 2006 and re-released for the "Hudson the Best" line-up on July 31, 2008.

Tengai Makyō: Daiyon no Mokushiroku is the eighth game in the Tengai Makyō series. Unlike previous installments in the series, which take place in a fictional version of Japan named "Jipang", the game takes place in a fictionalized and anachronized version of 1890s America.

Characters

Main characters 
 
 
 The 16-year-old male protagonist of the story. Raised by the legendary monster-hunter Red Bear from an early age, he is often entirely straightfaced in face of all of the insanity that occurs around him. He bears the mark of the "Flame Hero" on his left shoulder. The kanji of his name means "thunder god".
 
 
 The 12-year-old female protagonist of the story. She is a childhood friend of Raijin with a dark terrible fate involving her twin brother, Sam.
 
 
 A 35-year-old Jipang man who lives in America as a butcher, often daydreams of becoming a samurai. As a matter of fact, he left his wife and 2 children just to lead a wandering life of a samurai.
 
 
 A 17-year-old Indian warrior from Seattle. She bears the mark of the "Flame Hero" on her right breast, which she initially fears to be a sign of the devil.
 
 
 A direct descendant of Kabuki Danjuro living in America, his real name being Cherry Abes. despite being a descendant of a "Flame Hero", he has a very timid personality and shown to be very clumsy, but in times of need, he dons his mask as a "legendary sheriff who fights with the power of a hundred men" - Ace. He is also well versed with machinery.

Supporting characters 
 
 
 A legendary monster-hunter in America, who raised Raijin when he was a baby, he was ultimately killed in Alaska when he tried to slay Blizzard.
 
 
 A black-clothed man who meets Raijin in Alaska.
 
 
 A Jamaican Bobsleigh coach cursed with a power of a demon from a long time ago, he makes up for it by teaching local kids how to Bobsleigh in the deserts of Mexico.
 
 
 A cyborg found and activated by Ace, who gives his live up to save the party later in the game.
 NPC
 
 A NPC which can be named by the player in a scenario where the player must solve a puzzle in a picture book.
 
 
 Yumemi's older twin brother, who was unfortunately bewitched by Sanetomo when he woke him up from his slumber 6 years ago.

The Twelve Apostles 
 
 
 A member of the Twelve Apostles who governs Alaska. He dresses like a punk rocker and uses ice-based attacks.
 
 
 A member of the Twelve Apostles who governs Montana. She is a cabaret star who attempts to seduce the youth of Seattle with her music.
 
 
 A member of the Twelve Apostles who governs California in the guise of a famous director, in order to kidnap children by 'sucking them' into his movies, also made Manto USA famous.
 
 
 A member of the Twelve Apostles who governs Arizona. She is a morbidly obese, middle-aged woman with pig-like features. Her name was a pun on the term "bon appetit".
 
 
 A member of the Twelve Apostles who governs Mexico, turns children into zombies by digging out their hearts.
 
 
 A member of the Twelve Apostles who governs Texas.
 
 
 A member of the Twelve Apostles who governs Minnesota.
 
 
 A member of the Twelve Apostles who governs Florida. He has a small man's body and a television for a head.
 
 
 A member of the Twelve Apostles who governs Louisiana.
 
 
 A member of the Twelve Apostles who governs Michigan.
 
 
 A member of the Twelve Apostles who governs New York, fought twice throughout the entire course of the game.
 
 
 The leader of the Twelve Apostles. He adopts a polite tone of speech when talking to either friend or foe, the one responsible for brainwashing Sam. His ultimate goal was to recreate the Great flood.
 
 
 The final boss which had taken both Sam and Yumemi as its core.

Recurring characters 
 
 
 A homosexual man who often shows up in different parts of USA as a star scout for Hollywood. Like his ancestors, the Ashimoto brothers, he is a corrupted merchant as well, even though he was not doing any sort of business whatsoever.
 
 
 A loudmouthed baboon who is a supposed Hollywood star who took control of Lake Tahoe, calling himself king and setting monkeys loose everywhere on the street, fought as a gag boss.

Songs 
 
 Lyrics: Toyo Nagayama, Music: Toshiyuki Sasagawa, Arrangement: Takayuki Negishi
 Vocals: Tomo Sakurai
 
 Lyrics: Ōji Hiroi and Toyo Nagayama, Music: Toshiyuki Sasagawa, Arrangement: Akifumi Tada
 Vocals: Tomo Sakurai
 
 Lyrics: Toyo Nagayama, Music: Toshiyuki Sasagawa, Arrangement: Masami Kishimura
 Vocals: Yukana
 
 Lyrics: Toyo Nagayama, Music: Toshiyuki Sasagawa, Arrangement: Shinji Miyazaki
 Vocals: Chie Kōjiro
 
 Lyrics: Toyo Nagayama, Music: Toshiyuki Sasagawa, Arrangement: Shinji Miyazaki
 Vocals: Chie Kōjiro
 
 Lyrics: Toyo Nagayama, Music: Toshiyuki Sasagawa, Arrangement: Takayuki Negishi
 Vocals: Hironobu Kageyama
 
 Lyrics: Toyo Nagayama, Music: Toshiyuki Sasagawa, Arrangement: Akifumi Tada
 Vocals: Machiko Soga

1997 video games
Video games set in the 1890s
Japan-exclusive video games
PlayStation Portable games
Role-playing video games
Sega Saturn games
Video games developed in Japan
Video games set in the United States
Daiyon No Mokushiroku